Sir Ralph Waller KBE (born 11 December 1945) is Director of the Farmington Institute at Oxford, former Principal of Harris Manchester College, Oxford (1988-2018) and a Pro-Vice-Chancellor of the University of Oxford (2010-2018). He is a British Methodist Minister.

Ralph Waller was born in Lincolnshire and educated at the University of London (BD) and the University of Nottingham (MTh) and completed a PhD at King's College London.

In 1994 he was awarded the UK Templeton Prize for progress in religion.  He has been awarded honorary doctorates from universities in the United States, Europe and Great Britain, including a Doctor of Divinity from the University of Wales, a Doctor of Theology from the Uppsala University and a Doctor of Education from Liverpool Hope University.

He is the MacWilliams Fellow in Divinity in the University of Wales, Trinity St David. He is a trustee of several charitable trusts, including the Thrombosis Research Institute and MGC Futures.  He is the Chair of the Kalisher Trust, the Westminster College Trust and Vice-Chair of the governors of Harris Westminster Sixth Form Academy.  He is an ecumenical canon of Christ Church Cathedral, Oxford and of Ely Cathedral.

He was knighted in the Queen's Birthday Honours of 2018 for services to education.

Publications

Ralph Waller and Benedicta Ward, eds, An introduction to Christian spirituality (London: SPCK, 1999)
Benedicta Ward and Ralph Waller, eds, Joy of heaven: springs of Christian spirituality (London: SPCK, 2003)
Ralph Waller, John Wesley: a personal portrait (London: SPCK, 2003)

Sources and further information
Harris Manchester College, Oxford
Senate House Library
University Sermon: John Wesley
Oxford Blueprint
Hartwick College Annual Honors Convocation

1945 births
Living people
Alumni of King's College London
Principals of Harris Manchester College, Oxford
British theologians
British biblical scholars
English Methodist ministers
Alumni of the University of Nottingham
Knights Commander of the Order of the British Empire
Alumni of the University of London